Nikolaos "Nikos" Karabelas (born 20 December 1984) is a Greek footballer who plays as a left back.

Club career
Karabelas made his debut with his hometown's Paniliakos in the Beta Ethniki in 2004. Two years later he joined Superleague side Aris, and quickly established himself as a starter for the Yellows.

On 28 January 2009 Karabelas missed a penalty in a 0–0 draw against fierce rivals PAOK, which took Aris out of the Greek Cup finals. He subsequently received threats from the club's fans, and left the club in the end of the season.

On 10 June 2009 Karabelas signed a four-year deal with AEK Athens. After struggling to find his form in his debut season under Dušan Bajević, he appeared consistently in his second season, under Manolo Jiménez, and was deemed "irreplaceable" by the latter.

On 26 July 2012 Karabelas moved abroad for the first time in his career, by agreeing to a two-year deal with La Liga side Levante UD. He made his debut with the club on 19 August, starting and playing the full 90 minutes of a 1–1 home draw against Atlético Madrid. Karabelas appeared in only nine matches during the campaign, with the Valencian side achieving a comfortable mid-table finish.

In his second season with the Granotes, he was the most used left-back by manager Joaquín Caparrós, overtaking veteran Juanfran, and signed a new two-year deal on 20 March 2014.
On 1 February 2016, after 3,5 years in Levante UD, the Greek defender signed a six months contract with Segunda División club Real Valladolid.

On 30 August 2016, the international left back signed a three-season contract with Aris and returned to the club after seven years. On 8 January 2017 he scored his first goal against Panegialios.

International career
Karabelas was a member of the Greek U-21 team. On 14 May 2014 he was among the 30-man provisional squad for the 2014 FIFA World Cup, but was one of the seven players cut from Fernando Santos' final list.

He made his full international debut on 14 November 2014, in a UEFA Euro 2016 qualifying match against the Faroe Islands in Piraeus. Karabelas played 78 minutes of the shock 0–1 defeat before being replaced by Petros Mantalos.

Honours
AEK Athens
Greek Cup: 2010–11

References

External links

1984 births
Living people
Footballers from Pyrgos, Elis
Greek footballers
Association football defenders
Aris Thessaloniki F.C. players
Levante UD footballers
Real Valladolid players
Paniliakos F.C. players
AEK Athens F.C. players
Super League Greece players
La Liga players
Segunda División players
Greek expatriate footballers
Greek expatriate sportspeople in Spain
Expatriate footballers in Spain
Greece under-21 international footballers
Greece international footballers